Let It Rock may refer to:

 Let It Rock (magazine), a British monthly music magazine published between 1972 and 1975
 Sex (boutique), formerly Let It Rock, a London fashion boutique

Albums
 Let It Rock (1973 compilation), an album by Atlantic Records
 Let It Rock (Great White album)
 Let It Rock (Ronnie Hawkins album)
 Let It Rock: The Jerry Garcia Collection, Vol. 2, a 2009 album by the Jerry Garcia Band
 Let It Rock!, an album by The Connection

Songs
 "Let It Rock" (Chuck Berry song) covered by The Rolling Stones, Dave Edmunds, The Wildebeests, Skyhooks
 "Let It Rock" (Kevin Rudolf song), featuring Lil Wayne
 "Let It Rock", a song by Bon Jovi from Slippery When Wet